The Lola T88/50 is an open-wheel formula race car chassis developed by British manufacturer Lola, for use in the International Formula 3000 series, a feeder-series for Formula One, in 1988.

References 

Open wheel racing cars
International Formula 3000
Lola racing cars